Lu Suyan (born 29 May 1965) is a Chinese former cyclist. She competed at the 1984 Summer Olympics and the 1988 Summer Olympics and 1990 Asian Games.

References

External links
 

1965 births
Living people
Chinese female cyclists
Olympic cyclists of China
Cyclists at the 1984 Summer Olympics
Cyclists at the 1988 Summer Olympics
Place of birth missing (living people)
Asian Games medalists in cycling
Cyclists at the 1990 Asian Games
Medalists at the 1990 Asian Games
Asian Games gold medalists for China
20th-century Chinese women